(10 December 1990 – 5 September 2010) was a Japanese motorcycle racer. After a successful career in the All Japan Road Race Championship, he switched to MotoGP and competed in the 250cc class during 2009. In the 2010 season he rode in the newly created Moto2 class. Tomizawa won the first race of the new class, at Losail in Qatar, winning by nearly five seconds from Alex Debón and Jules Cluzel. Tomizawa died after sustaining cranial, thoracic and abdominal trauma at the San Marino Grand Prix.

Career
Tomizawa was born in Asahi City, Chiba. He started pocket bike racing at age 3 in 1994, and moved on to minibikes around 2001. While attending Sousa High School in Chiba, majoring in English, he started to fully participate in the 125cc class of All Japan Road Race Championship and gained 2nd place for 2006 season. Rookie of the Year was an added bonus to start the fast-paced career.

Tomizawa appeared on both 125cc and 250cc class in the following year, finishing 3rd in the 125, and 8th in the 250 for 2007 season. In 2008, he focused on the 250cc class and finished 2nd with his eyes set for global challenge.
Upon his high school graduation in March 2009, Tomizawa was recruited by new CIPMOTO-GP250 Team, ended his full-time, first international racing year in 17th place with best results at 10th twice at Motegi and Valencia respectively riding a Honda RS250R.

Riding a Suter motorbike, he won the inaugural Moto2 race at Losail, and followed this up with his first Grand Prix pole position and second place at the following round in Spain. He took a further pole position at Brno later in the season. Showing markedly improved form in comparison with his previous years in MotoGP, he was seventh in the championship after ten races. Commentator Toby Moody described him as a "future star".

Death

Tomizawa was competing in the eleventh round of the inaugural Moto2 World Championship, the San Marino Grand Prix at the Misano World Circuit on 5 September 2010. On lap 12, holding 4th place, Tomizawa fell at the Curvone, a fast right-hand corner, when he was forced wide and lost grip in his rear tire. He was then struck by the motorbikes of Scott Redding and Alex de Angelis, and suffered cranial, thoracic and abdominal trauma. He was initially taken to the circuit's medical centre, before being transferred to hospital in Riccione. He died from his injuries at 14:20 local time in hospital, aged 19. His death was announced at the end of the MotoGP race. The podium flags were lowered to half-mast, and the podium was celebrated without champagne.

Tomizawa was the first on-track fatality at Grand Prix level since his countryman Daijiro Kato was killed in the senior class at Suzuka in 2003. Tomizawa had placed Kato's racing number 74 on his left shoulder as a tribute to him.

Questions have been raised about the treatment of Tomizawa in the aftermath of the crash. Both he and Redding were hurriedly removed from the scene and bundled onto stretchers; the stretcher carrying Tomizawa appeared to be dropped in the gravel trap before he was removed. MotoGP Doctor Claudio Macchiagodena explained that "Many times it is very important to quickly have support. In this situation if you remove quickly, in my opinion, you have more possibility [to help the patient]" - a statement which ignores the possibility of spinal injuries. Alex Hofmann originally reported on German TV that neither Tomizawa nor Redding had suffered life-threatening injuries; he had apparently received this information from Dorna themselves.

It was reported that Rimini's state prosecutor, Paolo Giovagnoli, would begin an inquest that might involve criminal proceedings against as yet unnamed individuals.

Career statistics

Grand Prix motorcycle racing

By season

By class

Races by year
(key) (Races in bold indicate pole position, races in italics indicate fastest lap)

References

External links

1990 births
2010 deaths
People from Asahi, Chiba
Sportspeople from Chiba Prefecture
Japanese motorcycle racers
125cc World Championship riders
250cc World Championship riders
Moto2 World Championship riders
Motorcycle racers who died while racing
Sport deaths in Italy
Filmed deaths in motorsport